The Kelsey Range is a mountain range in Siskiyou County, California.

References 

Mountain ranges of Northern California
Mountain ranges of Siskiyou County, California